James Henry Beard (April 22, 1812 – October 20, 1893) was an American painter who specialized in the genre of portraits. He was elected as a member of the National Academy of Design in 1872.

Early life
Beard was born in Buffalo, New York on April 22, 1812 and later died in Flushing, Queens, New York in 1893. The son of English and Scottish immigrants, Beard's artistic interest and recognition of his capability took no time to blossom. It was after the Beard family's relocation to Ohio that he began the serious pursuit of honing his artistic capabilities.

Ohio
Beard began with a wide variety of painting techniques such as watercolor, acrylic, and pastel. It was in Painesville, Ohio that Beard studied under Jarvis Frary Hanks. His preferred genre of art was portrait painting; Henry Clay, John Quincy Adams, and Don Quixote are just a few of the figures he chose to depict.

New York
In 1846, at the age of 32, Beard returned to New York in order to get his work noticed. Two years later, his work paid off, as he was inducted into the National Academy of Design.
In 1870 he decided to make New York his permanent home. It was in New York City that he began his series of representations of dogs and cats that he is known for.

Artwork
Westward Ho (1850)
Peep at growing danger (1871)
The Widow (1872)
Mutual Friend (1875)
Parson's Pets (1875)
Attorney and Clients (1876)
Out All Night (1876)There's Many a Slip (1876)Consultation (1877)Don Quixote (1878)Sancho Panza (1878)It is very Queer, isn't it (1885)

The Illustrious GuestThe Illustrious Guest (1847) is a depiction of U.S. Senator Henry Clay of Kentucky, the presidential candidate whom Beard supported in 1844, who lost to James K. Polk of Tennessee. The painting shows Clay relaxing in a chair in a country tavern as others watch his every move, he being nonchalant about the presence of the other guests. Beard later complained that Clay may have lost to Polk because Clay spent too much of his time campaigning in taverns. In early 2009, The Illustrious Guest was featured on the PBS television program, Antiques Roadshow''. After viewing the program, art appraiser Alan Fausel was quoted as saying that the picture "could hang in an art museum". Rebecca Lawton, the curator of paintings and sculptures at the Amon Carter Museum in Fort Worth, Texas, said that she was intrigued by the painting when she saw it on PBS. Upon viewing the art piece in person, Lawton was able to place the painting in the museum.

See also
 William Holbrook Beard, his brother

References

External links

Artwork by James Henry Beard

19th-century American painters
American male painters
National Academy of Design members
1814 births
1893 deaths
Artists from Buffalo, New York
19th-century American male artists